The EuroCup Women is an international basketball club competition for women's clubs throughout Europe. The 2008–09 season involved 58 competing teams from 28 different countries. The Turkish team Galatasaray SK became the champion, defeating Cras Basket Taranto in the finals. Trailing by 12 points after the first leg in Italy, Galatasaray returned to Istanbul and won 82-61 for a 137-128 victory on aggregate.

Groups

Group A 

Group A

Group B 

Group B

Group C 

Group C

Group D 

Group D

Group E 

Group E

Group F 

Group F

Group G 

Group G

Group H 

Group H

Group I 

Group I

Group J 

Group J

Sixteenth-Finals

Eight-Finals

Quarter-finals

Semi-finals

Final

Notes and references 

2
EuroCup Women seasons